The 2014 Bowling Green Falcons football team represented Bowling Green State University in the 2014 NCAA Division I FBS football season. The Falcons played their home games at Doyt Perry Stadium. They were led by first year head coach Dino Babers and were members of the East Division of the Mid-American Conference. They finished the season 8–6, 5–3 in MAC play be champions of the East Division and qualify for the MAC Championship Game where they lost to West Division champion Northern Illinois. They were invited to the inaugural Camellia Bowl where they defeated South Alabama.

Schedule

References

Bowling Green
Bowling Green Falcons football seasons
Camellia Bowl champion seasons
Bowling Green Falcons football